Madawaska Middle/High School is a public secondary school, serving grades 7 through 12, located in Madawaska, Maine, United States.  The school serves students in from Madawaska, Saint David, and Grand Isle. The building also hosts the area's adult education program. It was first established in the 1940s.

Madawaska Middle/High school is in the Maine Principal's Association Class "C" for sports. The school's mascot is the owl. The school colors are blue and white.

References

External links
 

Public high schools in Maine
Schools in Aroostook County, Maine
Madawaska, Maine
Public middle schools in Maine
1940s establishments in Maine